The New Mt. Moriah Baptist Church is located at 13100 Woodward Avenue in Highland Park, Michigan in Metro Detroit. It was built in 1922 as the Trinity United Methodist Church, in the Gothic Revival style. It was listed on the National Register of Historic Places in 1982.

History
Trinity United Methodist was built by the Cass United Methodist Church of Detroit, as a mission church to serve membership in Highland Park who lived too far to travel the eight miles to Cass United. The structure served as a Methodist church from its dedication in 1923 until 1978. In the 1950s the church had a mission for Japanese people.

After Trinity left the building in 1978, the next year the New Mt. Moriah Baptist Church congregation moved into the building. New Mt. Moriah was established in 1952. As of 2021, the church remained in the building, led by Rev. Eddie Cooper, Jr., Pastor and First Lady Carlethia Cooper.

Architecture
The former Trinity United Methodist Church is a gray limestone, Gothic Revival church measuring 125 feet by 110 feet. The main facade has a gabled, two-story entrance pavilion with a recessed entrance located between a plain extension and a crenelated tower with belfry. On the side, there is a shallow, gabled transept with a large window, and a projecting entrance between the church and attached chapel.

References
 Mayer, Albert. Ethnic groups in Detroit, 1951. Wayne University Department of Sociology and Anthropology, 1951.
 Content re-posted to: Feinstein, Otto. Ethnic Communities of Greater Detroit. Monteith College, Wayne State University, 1970. p. 159.

Notes

Churches in Wayne County, Michigan
United Methodist churches in Michigan
Highland Park, Michigan
Churches completed in 1922
20th-century Methodist church buildings in the United States
National Register of Historic Places in Wayne County, Michigan
Churches on the National Register of Historic Places in Michigan
Gothic Revival church buildings in Michigan